Christine C. Ferguson is the director of the HealthSource RI, and a professor at George Washington University. She was Commissioner of Public health in Massachusetts.

References

Women government officials
Living people
Year of birth missing (living people)
Lincoln School (Providence, Rhode Island) alumni